The Griffin (or Gryphon) is a legendary creature with the body of a lion and the head and wings of an eagle. Combining the attributes of the "King of the Beasts" and the "King of the Air", it was thought to be especially powerful and majestic. Griffins appear widely as school sports team mascots, in heraldry and in corporate logos.

National symbols

The coat of arms of Latvia has a griffin on the shield and a griffin as a supporter. The griffin on the shield is holding a sword and is the symbol of Vidzeme and Latgale (Eastern Latvia), one of the historical territories making up modern day Latvia. The coat of arms of Lithuania also features a white griffin as a supporter.

Subdivisional and municipal coats of arms

Some municipalities have griffins derived from state or county arms, e.g. many towns in the ancient province of Pomerania in Germany (Mecklenburg-Vorpommern) and Poland (Pomeranian Voivodeship and West Pomeranian Voivodeship) have the Pomeranian griffin in their arms.

Subdivisions

Historical

Schools and Universities
The Beacon Academy in Biñan, Philippines.
The Cambridge School of Weston in Weston, Massachusetts.
Canisius College in Buffalo, New York.
Chestnut Hill College in Philadelphia, Pennsylvania.
College of William & Mary in Williamsburg, Virginia.
Downing College, Cambridge in Cambridge, England.
Fontbonne University in Clayton, Missouri
Gale Ranch Middle School in San Ramon, California
Glendale Preparatory Academy in Peoria, Arizona
Golden Gate University in San Francisco, California.
Grossmont Community College in El Cajon, California.
Gwynedd Mercy University in Gwynedd Valley, Pennsylvania.
Harvard Medical School in Boston, Massachusetts.
International School of Indiana in Indianapolis, Indiana.
Jamaica College in Kingston, Jamaica.
Johnson & Wales University
Lehigh University
Marymount Manhattan College in New York City.
Missouri Western State University in St. Joseph, Missouri.
Purdue University in West Lafayette, Indiana.
Redwood Middle School in Saratoga, California.
Reed College in Portland, Oregon.
Rocky Mount High School in Rocky Mount, North Carolina.
Sarah Lawrence College in Yonkers, New York.
Seton Hill University in Greensburg, Pennsylvania.
Trinity College, Oxford in Oxford, England.
Westminster College in Salt Lake City, Utah.
Buchtel High School in Akron, Ohio.
Dutchtown High School in Geismar, Louisiana.
Eric Hamber Secondary School in Vancouver, British Columbia.
Lincoln-Way East High School in Frankfort, Illinois.
Los Alamitos High School in Los Alamitos, California.
Pomfret School in Pomfret, Connecticut.
Winnetonka High School in Kansas City, Missouri.
St. John Vianney High School in Kirkwood, Missouri.
Springville-Griffith Institute in Springville, New York
Spartanburg Day School in Spartanburg, SC
Abingdon School in Abingdon, Oxfordshire.
Raffles Institution in Singapore.
University of Guelph in Guelph
MacEwan University in Edmonton
Father McGivney Catholic High School in Glen Carbon, Illinois
San Juan College High School in Farmington, New Mexico
Vrije Universiteit Amsterdam in Amsterdam, Netherlands

Sports and Athletics

The home ground of English football team Brentford FC is called Griffin Park because of the griffin that features in the logo of Fuller's Brewery, which had previously owned the land.  A local pub next to the ground is also named The Griffin.
Grand Rapids Griffins, a team in the American Hockey League.
Guelph Gryphons; the University of Guelph, Guelph, Ontario, Canada.
London Griffins; a rugby league club.
Waterloo Rugby Club 's badge features a griffin in the centre of a red Lancastrian Rose.
Genoa C.F.C.; a professional Italian football and cricket club based in the city of Genoa.
T.S.V. Gascogne; a Fencing club based in the city of Enschede

Other uses
Busch Gardens Williamsburg in Williamsburg, Virginia has announced their new roller coaster for 2007 will be The Griffon, designed by Swiss manufacturer Bolliger & Mabillard.
Midland Bank used a griffin as its symbol before it was subsumed into its HSBC parent company.
Norwegian Army 2nd Battalion has a griffin insignia
The Saab auto company features a profiled griffin head in its logo. Saab Aerospace built a fighter jet, the JAS 39 Gripen, meaning "griffin" in Swedish.
Scania, a Swedish truck and bus manufacturer, uses the griffin as its trademark.
Sprecher Brewery features a heraldic black griffin in its logo.  A cartoon griffin named Rooty appears on bottles of Sprecher Root Beer.
Vauxhall Motors of Luton, England, uses the griffin as its trademark.
The 367th Training Support Squadron unit patch is a Griffin holding a Globe and Torch.
Merv Griffin Entertainment used a griffin as its mascot & logo in its heyday.
The Chartered Institute of Procurement and Supply (HQ Stamford, UK) uses griffins in its coat of arms to signify protection (of money/valuables)
Stoewer, a defunct auto manufacturer used griffin as its logo

References

Mascots and Heraldry